The National Coalition of Alternative Community Schools, or NCACS, is an international organization based in the U.S. city of Ann Arbor, Michigan, dedicated to promoting alternative education. The organization was founded in 1978. It is known for its annual conferences, which bring together the community of community schools and homeschoolers and are held in a different location around the country each year. It also holds regional conferences. The NCACS also produces a directory of alternative community schools which it sells, as well as a quarterly newsletter.

Alternative Community Schools

The NCACS defines its membership as consisting of:

 Home educating parents and students
 Independent (private) alternative schools and programs
 Government (public) alternative schools and programs
 Alternative colleges and universities
 Experiential and adventure-oriented programs
 Learning centers and traveling schools
 Individuals and lifelong learners
 Cultural centers and intentional communities
 Publishers and researchers focused on alternative education topics

Annual conferences
 2006 - held on The Farm, Tennessee
 2005 - held in Chicago, Illinois
 2004 - held on The Farm, Tennessee
 1995 - held in Colorado
 1994 - held in Blacksburg, Virginia
 1993 - held near Jasper, Arkansas on the Buffalo National River
 1992 - held in Indiana

Member schools
A partial listing of NCACS member schools:
Clonlara School
Stonesoup School
Cobblestone School
The Forum
Upattinas School and Resource Center
Upland Hills School

External links
 NCACS homepage

See also
 Growing Without Schooling
 Homeschooling
 Grace Llewellyn

Alternative education
Organizations based in Ann Arbor, Michigan
Educational organizations based in the United States